Delias anamesa is a butterfly in the family Pieridae. It was described by Neville Henry Bennett in 1956. It is endemic to the Chimbu Province of Papua New Guinea.

The wingspan is about 68–80 mm.

Taxonomy
This species is often considered to be a subspecies of Delias niepelti, but was given specific status during a full review of the niepelti group.

References

External links
Delias at Markku Savela's Lepidoptera and Some Other Life Forms

anamesa
Butterflies described in 1956